Chingachgook is a fictional character in four of James Fenimore Cooper's five Leatherstocking Tales, including his 1826 novel The Last of the Mohicans. Chingachgook was a lone Mohican chief and companion of the series' hero, Natty Bumppo. In The Deerslayer, Chingachgook married Wah-ta-Wah, who bore him a son named Uncas, but died while she was still young. Uncas, who was at his birth "last of the Mohicans", grew to manhood but was killed in a battle with the Huron warrior Magua. Chingachgook died as an old man in the novel The Pioneers, which makes him the actual "last of the Mohicans," having outlived his son.

The Leatherstocking Tales 
In the series The Leatherstocking Tales by James Fenimore Cooper, Chingachgook is the best friend and companion of the main character Natty Bumppo, aka Hawkeye. He appears in The Deerslayer, The Last of the Mohicans, The Pathfinder, and The Pioneers. He is characterized by his skills as a warrior and forester, his bravery, his wisdom, and his pride for his tribe.

Other literature
Chingachgook is a major character in Song of the Mohicans by Paul Block (Bantam Books, 1985), a sequel to The Last of the Mohicans. Taking up the story a few days after Uncas' death and burial, it recounts the adventures of Hawkeye and Chingachgook as they travel north to discover the connection between an Oneida brave and the Mohican tribe, and whether a sachem truly holds the key to the ultimate fate of the Mohicans.

Etymology and pronunciation
Chingachgook is said to have been modeled after a real-life wandering Mohican basket maker and hunter named Captain John. The fictional character, occasionally called John Mohegan in the series, was an idealized embodiment of the traditional noble savage. The French often refer to Chingachgook as "", the Great Snake, because he understands the winding ways of men's nature and he can strike a sudden, deadly blow.

The name is derived from the Lenape language, which is closely related to the Mohican language. In Lenape,  means 'big' and  means 'snake'. Chingachgook is derived from Lenape , 'big snake', pronounced . The digraph  in the spelling used by John Heckewelder, the source for the name, and the letter  in modern Lenape spelling both represent the voiceless velar fricative sound  (as in "Bach"), not the voiceless palato-alveolar affricate  (as in "church").

Cooper got the name from Heckewelder's book History, Manners, and Customs of the Indian Nations who once inhabited Pennsylvania and the Neighboring States (1818), which cited a Lenape word as "" (in Heckewelder's spelling which was influenced by German), meaning "a large snake". He gave this word as such in the context of how to use the adjective  (pronounced ) 'large', which Heckewelder spelled .

Portrayals in film and television

The first film portrayal of Chingachgook was by Wallace Reid in a 1913 film version of The Deerslayer.

Bela Lugosi played Chingachgook in two German silent films, Lederstrumpf, 1. Teil: Der Wildtöter und Chingachgook (Leatherstocking 1: The Deerslayer and Chingachgook) and Lederstrumpf, 2. Teil: Der Letzte der Mohikaner (Leatherstocking 2: The Last of the Mohicans), both filmed in 1920.

Jay Silverheels, best known for his role as Tonto on The Lone Ranger, played Chingachgook in the 1953 film version of The Pathfinder.

Lon Chaney Jr. played Chingachgook in the 1957 TV series Hawkeye and the Last of the Mohicans.

Chingachgook, played by Gojko Mitić, was the main character of an East German western, Chingachgook the Great Serpent (1967), based on Cooper's novels.

In the BBC miniseries The Last of the Mohicans and The Pathfinder, Chingachgook was played by John Abineri.

Chingachgook was played by Ned Romero in the TV versions of The Last of the Mohicans (1977) and The Deerslayer (1978), by Russell Means in the 1992 film adaptation of The Last of the Mohicans, by Rodney A. Grant in the 1994 TV series Hawkeye and by Graham Greene in the 1996 TV version of The Pathfinder.

Many films portray Chingachgook with long hair, braided or flowing. A notable exception is the 1920 adaptation which faithfully represents him with a tuft on his shaved head, according to the novel.

In Boy Scout legend
In the Ordeal Ceremony of the Order of the Arrow, a program of the Boy Scouts of America, the Legend of the Order refers to an imaginary Lenni Lenape chief named Chingachgook. In the legend, Chingachgook's son, Uncas, is the original propagator of the Order. Chingachgook wanted to create a band of volunteers from all the nations of the Delaware River valley to support and protect their collective interests. Uncas volunteered to be the first member of such a group, and thus the Order of the Arrow was founded.

According to the Boy Scouts of America's Ordeal Ceremony, the correct pronunciation of the name is ching-gatch-gook. Professor William A. Starna, of SUNY Oneonta, says the initial "ch" sound would be pronounced more like the German guttural "h" than an English "ch". Chingachgook is an Algonquian word meaning big (ching) snake (achgook); hence the references to the character in the book as The Great Serpent.

References

Literary characters introduced in 1823
Characters in American novels of the 19th century
Drama film characters
Fictional Native American people
Fictional sole survivors
Fictional tribal chiefs
James Fenimore Cooper
Male characters in literature